Seung, also spelled Sung, is an uncommon Korean surname, a single-syllable Korean given name, and a common element in two-syllable Korean given names. As a given name, its meaning differs based on the hanja used to write it. There are 17 hanja with the reading  on the South Korean government's official list of hanja which may be registered for use in given names.

As a surname
There are two hanja which may be used to write the surname Seung, each indicating different lineages. The 2000 South Korean census found 3,304 people with these surnames.

More common (承)
The more common Seung surname is written with a hanja meaning "inherit". The 2000 South Korean census found 2,494 people with this family name, and 762 households. The surviving bon-gwan (origin of a clan lineage, not necessarily the actual residence of the clan members) at that time included:
Yeonil: 1,828 people and 568 households. They claim descent from Seung Gae, a general under Jeongjong, 10th monarch of Goryeo. 
Gwangsan: 643 people and 188 households. This is a different name for the Yeonil Seung clan, claiming descent from the same ancestor.
Yangju: Six people and two households.
Other or undistinguished bon-gwan: 17 people and four households.

People with this surname include:

T. K. Seung (born 1930), Korean-born American philosopher and literary critic
Seung H-Sang (born Seung Hyo-sang, 1952), South Korean architect
Sung Hyang-sim (born 1999), North Korean footballer
Sebastian Seung, American physicist and neuroscientist of Korean descent

Less common (昇)
The less common Seung surname is written with a hanja meaning "rise". The 2000 South Korean census found 810 people with this family name, and 239 households. The surviving bon-gwan at that time included:

Namwon: 613 people and 183 households
Changpyeong: 134 people and 39 households
Geumseong: 20 people and five households
Miryang: 14 people and three households
Naju: Six people and three households
Other or undistinguished bon-gwan: 21 people and four households

In given names

Hanja and meaning
Article 44 of South Korea's  gives the Supreme Court the power to define the list of hanja permitted for use in given names. Under the Supreme Court's regulations, that list consists of the Basic Hanja for educational use and a list of additional hanja permitted for use in given names. Among those hanja, there are 17 with the reading , plus one variant form:

: "to ride"
: "to inherit"
: "to win"
: "to rise"
: "monk"
: "to help"
: "to rise"
 (variant)
: "rope"
: "fly"
: "to rise"
: "heddle"
: "to inherit"
: "ridge"
: "to flatter"
: "to rise"
: "to have tangled hair"
: used in the name of a body of water

First syllable

Seung-ah
Seung-chul
Seung-eun
Seung-gi
Seung-hee
Seung-heon
Seung-hwa
Seung-hwan
Seung-hyun, which was the 10th-most popular given name for newborn boys in 1990
Seung-ho
Seung-hoon
Seung-jae
Seung-jun
Seung-min
Seung-soo
Seung-won
Seung-woo
Seung-yeon
Seung-yong
Seung-yoon

Second syllable
Hyun-seung

People
People with the single-syllable given name Seung include:

Seong Seung (died 1456), Joseon Dynasty soldier
Park Seung (born 1936), South Korean banker
Suh Sung (born 1945), Zainichi Korean who was held as a political prisoner in South Korea for 19 years

See also
List of Korean family names
List of Korean given names

References 

Korean-language surnames
Korean given names